Oakland is a historic home located near Bryantown, Charles County, Maryland, United States. It is a two-story, three-bay brick dwelling constructed in the Federal style between 1822 and 1823. About 1880, the Greek Revival entrance and the Italianate front porch were constructed.

It was listed on the National Register of Historic Places in 1983.

References

External links
, including photo from 1982, at Maryland Historical Trust

Houses in Charles County, Maryland
Houses on the National Register of Historic Places in Maryland
Federal architecture in Maryland
Houses completed in 1823
National Register of Historic Places in Charles County, Maryland